Malyi (meaning "little", "small") is a surname. Notable people with the surname include:

 Eduard Malyi (born 1969), Russian footballer
 Leon Malyi (born 1958), Ukrainian bishop
 Serhiy Malyi (born 1990), Ukrainian-Kazakhstani footballer

See also
 
 Maly (disambiguation)

Ukrainian-language surnames